Stafford Dean (born 20 June 1937) is a British bass opera singer.

Stafford Dean was born in Kingswood, Surrey, England.  He studied under Howell Glynne and others.

Of particular note was his performance as Pooh-Bah in the BBC production of Mikado, and his outstanding rendition of the role of Alfonso d'Este in the 1980 Covent Garden production of Donizetti's opera Lucrezia Borgia.

Dean has a wide international following.

References

External links

Biography 
Interview with Stafford Dean and Anne Howells, December 2, 1980

1937 births
Living people
People from Reigate and Banstead (district)
British basses
Operatic basses
20th-century British male opera singers
21st-century British male opera singers
Musicians from Surrey